The name Yagi has been used to name four tropical cyclones in the northwestern Pacific Ocean. The name was submitted by Japan and is the Japanese word for goat or the Japanese name of the constellation Capricornus.
 Typhoon Yagi (2000) (T0019, 29W, Paring) – impacted the Ryukyu Islands.
 Typhoon Yagi (2006) (T0614, 16W) – strongest typhoon of the 2006 season which eventually did not threaten significant land areas.
 Tropical Storm Yagi (2013) (T1303, 03W, Dante) – impacted the Philippines and Japan.
 Tropical Storm Yagi (2018) (T1814, 18W, Karding) – affected the Philippines, Ryukyu Islands, Taiwan and East China.

Pacific typhoon set index articles